Ruds Vedby, in Sorø Municipality, is a small town located on the railway between Tølløse and Høng in West Zealand, eastern Denmark. Ruds Vedby is located 18 km north of Slagelse, 8 km west of Dianalund and 20 km north-west of Sorø. As of 1 January 2022, the population was 1,696.

History
It takes its name after Vedbygård manor, to which it owes its existence, and the Rud family who owned from 1421 until 1671 (Rud's Vedby).

Attractions
 Vedbygård (park open at Sundays)
 Ruds Vedby Church

Transport
Ruds Vedby station is located on the Høng–Tølløse railway line. Train service is operated by the railway company Lokaltog A/S.

References

Cities and towns in Region Zealand
Sorø Municipality